U.S. Route 101 Business is a business loop of U.S. Route 101 that runs along Wildwood Avenue in Rio Dell in Humboldt County, California. Its southernmost section between US 101 near Scotia to the north end of the Eel River Bridge is legally defined as an unsigned state highway, State Route 283 (SR 283). The route was defined in 1970 as a transfer from a realigned US 101 after a freeway bypass was built.

Route description 

State Route 283 spurs out of US 101 near Scotia, south of Rio Dell, while carrying US 101 Business from that intersection to the Eel River Bridge. After crossing the bridge, SR 283 ends and US 101 Business continues north through the center of Rio Dell to US 101 in the northern part of the city.

SR 283 includes the length of the Eel River Bridge, keeping its maintenance to Caltrans. The bridge itself was built in 1941, when U.S. Route 101 ran through what was then known as Eagle Prairie.  In 1977, the bridge was renamed the Albert Stanwood Murphy Memorial Bridge, in honor of the Pacific Lumber Company president who assisted the Save the Redwoods League.  In 1990, the bridge was given a second name, the Eagle Prairie Bridge, in honor of the 50th anniversary of the bridge's construction and the 25th anniversary of Rio Dell's incorporation.

SR 283 is not part of the National Highway System, a network of highways that are considered essential to the country's economy, defense, and mobility by the Federal Highway Administration.

Major intersections

See also

References

External links

Caltrans:  Route 283 highway conditions
California Highways:  Route 283
California @ AARoads.com - State Route 283

283
State Route 283
U.S. Route 101
State highways in the United States shorter than one mile